This is a list of finalists for the 2012 Archibald Prize for portraiture. As the images are copyrighted, an external link to an image has been listed where available (listed is Artist – Title).

Vernon Ah Kee – I see Deadly people, Lex Wotton 
Monika Behrens – The artist’s practice  (Self-portrait)
Kate Beynon – Lindy Lee (Year of the Dragon) 
Natasha Bieniek – Fluoroscuro  (Self-portrait) (Image)
Marcus Callum – Self-portrait  (Image)
Adam Chang – Emile Sherman  (Image)
Jun Chen – John Yu with artist  (Image)
Luke Cornish – Father Bob (Bob Maguire) (Image)
Adam Cullen – Nelson and Koko (Nelson Woss) (Image)
Jodi Daley – Foras admonitio, Private X 
Melissa Egan – Old master, Charles Blackman 
Robin Eley – Bibliography  (Self-portrait)
David Fairbairn – Large head JB no. 1 (with blue ground)  (James Barker) (Image)
Vincent Fantauzzo – Kimbra (the build up) (Image)
Juan Ford –  Ultrapilgrim  (Self-portrait)
Benjamin Hedstrom – Annandale band meeting
Jeremy Kibel – Jeremy Kibel – self-portrait  (Image)
Rhys Lee – Self-portrait with shiny cardboard armour  (Image)
Angus McDonald – Tim Maguire
Tim McMonagle – Michael Buxton  (Image)
Nigel Milsom – Untitled (Kerry Crowley)) (Image)
Paul Newton – Portrait of David Gonski AC  (Image)
Michael Peck –  Self-portrait in the image of my son  (Image)
Ben Quilty – Captain S after Afghanistan  (Image)
Reko Rennie – Hetti (Hetti Perkins) (Image)
Leslie Rice – Seeking a change, Madame Lulu, bearded lady, becomes ‘Tattooed Suzie’ – portrait of Lucky ‘Diamond’ Rich  (Image)
Luke Roberts – In mob we trust (Richard Bell)  (Image)
Paul Ryan – Cullen – been feudin (Adam Cullen) (Image)
Jenny Sages – After Jack  (Self portrait) (Winner of the 2012 People's Choice Award) (Image)
Wendy Sharpe – Self-portrait in Antarctica with penguin and Mawson’s huts 
Martin Sharp – The thousand dollar bill  (Portrait of David Gulpilil) (Image)
Raelene Sharp – A strength of character  (Portrait of John Wood) (Winner of the 2012 Packing Room Prize) (Image)
 Garry Shead –  Martin Sharp and his magic theatre  (Image)
 Jiawei Shen –  Homage to Esben Storm (Image)
Gary Smith and Frank Thirion –  The faceless men 
Nick Stathopoulos –  Art does belong. Portrait of Fenella Kernebone (Image)
Tim Storrier – The histrionic wayfarer (after Bosch) (Self-portrait) (Winner of the 2012 Archibald Prize) (Image)
Kate Tucker – Melody (you’re the only one who saves me) – portrait of Missy Higgins  (Image)
Michael Vale – Night of the wolverine – a portrait of Dave Graney and Clare Moore (Image)
Craig Waddell –  I see myself in you – self-portrait 
Rose Wilson – Brother of John (Portrait of Dan Flynn) (Image)

See also 
Previous year: List of Archibald Prize 2011 finalists
Next year: List of Archibald Prize 2013 finalists
List of Archibald Prize winners

External links
Archibald Prize 2012 finalists official website

2012
Arch
Archibald Prize 2012
Archibald Prize 2012
Arch
Archibald